The Spero Hotel, originally the Hotel Californian and later the Serrano Hotel, is a historic hotel building in San Francisco, California. It was designed by Edward E. Young and built in 1923. A four story addition designed by Alfred Henry Jacobs was completed in 1929. The 12-story hotel is at 405 Taylor Street. It underwent a $16 million renovation and became the Spero Hotel in 2018. It is listed on the listed on the National Register of Historic Places in San Francisco, California.

History
The building was initially an upscale apartment hotel and was owned by former builder M. A. Little who operated it as a hostelry.

In 1935 the building was purchased by Lizzie Glide. Her husband was a stockman and after his death oil was discovered from his property allowing her to fund the Glide Foundation and carry out mission work including the Glide Memorial Methodist Church (two blocks from the Hotel Californian), a dormitory for Christian girls on the UC Berkeley campus, and a home for young Christian working women. From 1935 until 1978 the Hotel Californian was a temperance hotel.

Attendees at the 1938 NEA Convention stayed at the hotel and held a luncheon there.

Architecture
The building's exterior was constructed in a Renaissance Revival architecture style while the lobby was designed with Spanish Colonial Revival architecture features. The addition by Jacobs finished in 1929 added Art Deco features to the building's exterior. The exterior includes pressed metal panels, balconies, and elaborate cornice decoration. It also features marble floors.

The lobby has columns with a twisting design and decorative ironwork. Ground floor retail spaces have evolved over the years while the upper floors have remained largely intact.

Eateries
It included a coffee shop and soda fountain counter area. It now has a restaurant.

References

National Register of Historic Places in San Francisco
Commercial buildings completed in 1923
Renaissance Revival architecture in California